Robert Leota (born 3 March 1997) is an Australian professional rugby union player for the Melbourne Rebels in Super Rugby and for  in international rugby. His usual position is flanker and Number 8.

Professional career 
Leota made his debut for the Rebels against the Crusaders as a replacement in a heavy defeat at AMI Stadium.

Leota was named in 's team for the 2021 Rugby Championship match against , played on the Gold Coast. He made his test debut in the 74th minute of the match, won 28–26 against the World Cup champions.

Statistics

References

External links 
 Rob Leota at Wallabies
 

1997 births
Australian rugby union players
Australia international rugby union players
Australian sportspeople of Samoan descent
Rugby union flankers
Melbourne Rebels players
Living people
Rugby union number eights
Melbourne Rising players
Rugby union players from Melbourne
People from Preston, Victoria